Muraenolepis is a genus of eel cods.

Species
The currently recognized species in this genus are:
 Muraenolepis andriashevi Balushkin & Prirodina, 2005
 Muraenolepis evseenkoi Balushkin & Prirodina, 2010
 Muraenolepis kuderskii Balushkin & Prirodina, 2007 
 Muraenolepis marmorata Günther, 1880 (marbled moray cod)
 Muraenolepis microps Lönnberg, 1905 (smalleye moray cod)
 Muraenolepis orangiensis Vaillant, 1888 (Patagonian moray cod)
 Muraenolepis pacifica Prirodina & Balushkin, 2007 (southern Pacific moray cod)
 Muraenolepis trunovi Balushkin & Prirodina, 2006

References

Gadiformes
Taxa named by Albert Günther